Nikšić Royal Palace, also referred to as King Nikola's Palace is a (former) royal residence in Nikšić, Montenegro. It is located in the city center near town park. The two-storied palace was built by king Nikola I Petrović-Njegoš in 1890. However, it was rarely used. Currently, it houses the Zavičajni Muzej (County Museum), documenting the historical development of the city.

References

Nikšić
Palaces in Montenegro
Royal residences in Montenegro